Outlaw Nation is an American comic book series originally published by Vertigo Comics from 2000 to 2002, and created by Jamie Delano and Goran Sudzuka about a family with extremely long lifespans.

Collected editions
The series was collected by Desperado Studios and Image Comics into a single black & white trade paperback containing 456 pages, which was released on November 8, 2006.

External links
 Jamie Delano: Earning Outlaw Status, Comics Bulletin, September 8, 2000
 To Live Outside The Law You Must Be Honest interview, December 2001
 IGN comics reprint of press release

Image Comics titles